Eva Sládeková (born December 17, 1981 in Trenčín) is a Slovak badminton player. She is a two-time national badminton champion in the women's singles (2005 and 2007), and also, a member of the badminton team for M-Šport Trenčín Club, under her personal coach and former partner Michal Matejka.

Sladekova held her distinction of being the first Slovak badminton player to compete at the 2008 Summer Olympics in Beijing. She received a bye for the second preliminary round match of the women's singles, before losing out to Hong Kong's Wang Chen, with a score of 7–21 each in two straight periods.

References

External links

1981 births
Slovak female badminton players
Living people
Olympic badminton players of Slovakia
Badminton players at the 2008 Summer Olympics
Sportspeople from Trenčín